NuCalc, also known as Graphing Calculator, is a computer software tool made by the company Pacific Tech. The tool can perform many graphing calculator functions. It can graph inequalities and vector fields, as well as functions in two, three, or four dimensions. It supports several different coordinate systems, and can solve equations. It is available for OS X (under the name Graphing Calculator) and Microsoft Windows.

History
The Graphing Calculator 1.0 software was bundled for free on all Power Macintosh computers since its introduction in 1994.  Having shipped on more than 20 million machines, it is the most familiar version of the program. This version of Graphing Calculator was secretly developed at Apple by Ron Avitzur, an abandoned contractor who felt obligated to complete the project, and their friend and colleague Greg Robbins.  They also made a version for older 680x0 Macintosh computers called NuCalc 1.0.  In 2005, This American Life featured Avitzur's story in episode 284, Should I Stay or Should I go?

Later models of Power Macintosh computers included newer versions of the Graphing Calculator program.  At one time, versions were available for free download for Mac OS 9, Mac OS X 10.3, and Mac OS X 10.4.  However, these versions may lack some of the features of the original version 1.0 program and may include promotion for the more advanced, commercial version of the software.  A Windows version (offered for sale) was at one time renamed NuCalc.

, the latest commercial version was Graphing Calculator 5.2. It has also been ported from C++ to SwiftUI.

Product
Graphing Calculator Version 4 was published for Mac OS X and Microsoft Windows. Pacific Tech also offers free-of-charge downloads of a viewer for saved graphs. Subsets of functionality are available as separate applications: Graphing Calculator Lite, Equation Calculator, Data Calculator, 2D Grapher, 3D Grapher, and 4D Grapher.

See also
 Grapher — Apple's replacement is included with Mac OS X 10.4

References

External links
NuCalc/Graphing Calculator homepage
Information and Download for the original Graphing Calculator 1.0 for PowerPC and 680x0 Macs can still be found here

Google Tech Talk of the story behind NuCalc

Plotting software
MacOS graphics-related software
Windows graphics-related software